The 2017–18 Colorado State Rams women's basketball team represents Colorado State University in the 2017–18 NCAA Division I women's basketball season. The Rams, led by sixth year head coach Ryun Williams, play their home games at Moby Arena, and were members of the Mountain West Conference. They finished the season 21–12, 11–7 in Mountain West play to finish in a tie for fourth place. They advanced to the semifinals of the Mountain West Conference women's basketball tournament where they lost to Boise State. They received an at-large bid to the Women's National Invitation Tournament where they defeated Western Illinois in the first round before losing in to South Dakota in the second round.

Roster

Schedule

|-
!colspan=9 style="background:#00674E; color:#FFC44F;"| Exhibition

|-
!colspan=9 style="background:#00674E; color:#FFC44F;"| Non-conference regular season

|-
!colspan=9 style="background:#00674E; color:#FFC44F;"| Mountain West regular season

|-
!colspan=9 style="background:#00674E;"| Mountain West Women's Tournament

|-
!colspan=9 style="background:#00674E;"| WNIT

See also
 2017–18 Colorado State Rams men's basketball team

References

Colorado State
Colorado State Rams women's basketball seasons
Colorado State Rams
Colorado State Rams
Colorado